The 2018–19 Colgate Raiders women's basketball team represents Colgate University during the 2018–19 NCAA Division I women's basketball season. The Raiders, led by third year head coach Bill Cleary, play their home games at Cotterell Court and were members of the Patriot League. They finished the season 12–17, 8–10 in Patriot League play to finish in sixth place. They lost in the quarterfinals of the Patriot League women's tournament to Lehigh.

Roster

Schedule

|-
!colspan=9 style=| Non-conference regular season

|-
!colspan=9 style=| Patriot League regular season

|-
!colspan=9 style=| Patriot League Women's Tournament

See also
 2018–19 Colgate Raiders men's basketball team

References

Colgate
Colgate Raiders women's basketball seasons